Miss Venezuela 1953 was the second edition of Miss Venezuela pageant held at Valle Arriba Golf Club in Caracas, Venezuela, on June 27, 1953, after days of events. The winner of the pageant was Gisela Bolaños, Miss Carabobo.

Results
Miss Venezuela 1953 - Gisela Bolaños (Miss Carabobo)
1st runner-up - Delmira Antonetti (Miss Monagas)
2nd runner-up - Margot Léidenz (Miss Falcón)
3rd runner-up - Ursula Quero (Miss Distrito Federal)

Special awards
 Miss Simpatia (Miss Congeniality) - Irma Fadul (Miss Barinas)
 Miss Amistad (Miss Friendship) - Aura Santos (Miss Anzoátegui)

Delegates

 Miss Anzoátegui - Aura Santos Silva
 Miss Barinas - Irma Fadul Aragón
 Miss Carabobo - Gisela Bolaños Scarton
 Miss Cojedes - Carmen Emilia Monagas
 Miss Distrito Federal - Ursula Quero Pérez
  Miss Falcón - Margot Léidenz Navas
 Miss Lara - Bertha De Lima
 Miss Mérida - Ruth Margarita Tirado
 Miss Monagas - Delmira Antonetti Núñez
 Miss Sucre - Cristina Martínez Raffalli
 Miss Táchira - Elena Ruiz
 Miss Trujillo - Libia Hernández Rosales

External links
Miss Venezuela official website

1953 beauty pageants
1953 in Venezuela